Universal Conceptual Cognitive Annotation (UCCA)  is a semantic approach to grammatical representation.  It is a cross-linguistically applicable semantic representation scheme, and has demonstrated support for rapid annotation.

References

Grammar frameworks
Semantics